The Lepage River is a tributary of the Senneterre River, flowing into the municipality of Senneterre, Quebec (parish) and Senneterre, Quebec, into the administrative region of Abitibi-Témiscamingue, in Quebec, in Canada. The course of the "river Lepage" crosses the townships of Tiblemont and Senneterre.

Forestry is the main economic activity of the sector; recreational tourism activities, second. The area is served by some secondary forest roads.

The surface of the river is usually frozen from mid-December to mid-April, however, safe ice circulation is generally from mid-December to late March.

Geography 
The hydrographic slopes adjacent to the "Lepage River" are:
North side: Parent Lake (Abitibi), Mégiscane River;
East side: Mégiscane River, Tavernier River;
South side: Guillemette Creek, Guéguen Lake, Saint Vincent River;
West side: Senneterre River, Tiblemont Lake, Bell River.

The Lepage River originates from a creek in a wetland at the confluence of two streams at:
 Southeast of the Canadian National Railway bridge over the Bell River at Senneterre, Quebec;
 South of the mouth of the Lepage River (confluence with the Senneterre River);
 South of the Canadian National Railway;
 Northeast of a bay on the East shore of Tiblemont Lake.

From its source, the river Lepage flows over the 98th percentile into the back of the bus on a school trip.
 northward in the township of Tiblemont to the southern limit of the town of Senneterre, Quebec;
 in Senneterre, Quebec (township of Senneterre) northerly forming a deviation to the east to the Canadian National Railway;
 north, then northwest, to mouth.

The mouth of the "Lepage River" flows on the eastern shore of the Senneterre River, is located in the forest zone at:
 Northeast of the railway bridge spanning the Bell River to Senneterre, Quebec;
 south of the mouth of the Senneterre River (confluence with Adolphus Bay of Parent Lake (Abitibi);
 Northeast of the Canadian National Railway;
 South of the mouth of Parent Lake (Abitibi).

Toponymy 
The term "Lepage" is a family name of French origin.

The toponym "Lepage River" was formalized on December 5, 1968, at the Commission de toponymie du Québec, at the creation of this commission.

See also 

Bell River, a watercourse
Lake Matagami, a body of water
Nottaway River, a watercourse
James Bay
Jamésie
Senneterre, Quebec (parish), a municipality
Senneterre, Quebec, a city
List of rivers of Quebec

References

External links 

Rivers of Abitibi-Témiscamingue